Taimur Khan (born 25 January 1991) is a Pakistani first-class cricketer who played for Quetta cricket team. In September 2019, he was named in Balochistan's squad for the 2019–20 Quaid-e-Azam Trophy tournament.

References

External links
 

1991 births
Living people
Pakistani cricketers
Baluchistan cricketers
Quetta cricketers
Cricketers from Quetta